Blue Skies is an American sitcom that aired from September 12, 1994 to October 24, 1994.

The show aired Monday nights at 8:30pm on ABC. Three months after it was canceled, another sitcom by the same creators (John Peaslee and Judd Pillot) and featuring several of the same cast members (Julia Campbell, Richard Kind and Stephen Tobolowsky), A Whole New Ballgame, aired in the same timeslot.

Premise
Two guys operate the Blue Skies Trading Company, a mail-order business in Boston.

Cast
Matt Roth as Russell Evans
Corey Parker as Joel Goodman
Julia Campbell as Ellie Baskin
Stephen Tobolowsky as Oak
Richard Kind as Kenny
Adilah Barnes as Eve Munroe

Episodes

References

External links

1994 American television series debuts
1994 American television series endings
1990s American sitcoms
English-language television shows
American Broadcasting Company original programming
Television series by Universal Television
Television shows set in Boston